Kediet ej Jill is a mountain in Tiris Zemmour, Mauritania, with the city of Zouérat on its east and Fderick at west.

The mountain and its surrounding area are rich in iron deposits, thought to have been mined here since the 11th century and commercially exploited since 1952. The current mines are connected to Nouadhibou on the Atlantic coast by a 700-km long railway.

The mountain appears bluish because of the high concentration of magnetite, an iron ore and a natural magnet. Owing to its inherent magnetic properties, the mountain disrupts navigational compasses. Similar magnetic fields allowed the discovery of other deposits in the region (magnetite guelbs) in the 1960s.

References

External links

 Kediet ej Jill, Tiris Zemmour, Mauritania
 

Landforms of Mauritania
Tiris Zemmour Region
Highest points of countries
Inselbergs of Africa